The 1978–79 Phoenix Suns season was the 11th season for the Phoenix Suns of the National Basketball Association and the first time they reached the 50-win mark to end the regular season. The team repeated a second-place finish in an expanded Pacific division and the Western Conference's second-best record, thus earning a spot in the playoffs, the franchise's first time extending the season in back-to-back seasons. For the first time since the '75–'76 team, the Suns returned to the Western Conference Finals, before being dispatched by Pacific division champion Seattle in seven games. The Suns were led by head coach John MacLeod and played all home games in Arizona Veterans Memorial Coliseum.

Paul Westphal, whom led the Suns with his 24 points per game, made his third straight appearance in the All-Star Game and was again named to the All-NBA First Team. Walter Davis followed up his Rookie of the Year Award performance from the previous season with his second consecutive All-Star selection and by season's end, voted to the All-NBA Second Team. Fourth-year big man Alvan Adams hauled in a career-high 9.2 rebounds a game to go with an average of 17.8 points.

Offseason

NBA Draft

Roster

Regular season

Standings

Record vs. opponents

Game log

!!Streak
|-
|- align="center" bgcolor="#ccffcc"
| 1
| October 13
| San Diego
| W 128–114
| Paul Westphal (21)
| Arizona Veterans Memorial Coliseum11,217
| 1–0
| W 1
|- align="center" bgcolor="#ccffcc"
| 2
| October 15
| Golden State
| W 129–110
| Walter Davis (35)
| Arizona Veterans Memorial Coliseum9,750
| 2–0
| W 2
|- align="center" bgcolor="#ffcccc"
| 3
| October 17
| San Antonio
| L 107–110
| Paul Westphal (24)
| Arizona Veterans Memorial Coliseum8,755
| 2–1
| L 1
|- align="center" bgcolor="#ccffcc"
| 4
| October 18
| @ Golden State
| W 122–112
| Paul Westphal (33)
| Oakland–Alameda County Coliseum Arena7,139
| 3–1
| W 1
|- align="center" bgcolor="#ccffcc"
| 5
| October 22
| @ Portland
| W 124–116
| Walter Davis (28)
| Memorial Coliseum12,666
| 4–1
| W 2
|- align="center" bgcolor="#ccffcc"
| 6
| October 24
| Milwaukee
| W 124–116
| Walter Davis (38)
| Arizona Veterans Memorial Coliseum11,728
| 5–1
| W 3
|- align="center" bgcolor="#ffcccc"
| 7
| October 25
| @ Denver
| L 104–108
| Paul Westphal (29)
| McNichols Sports Arena14,448
| 5–2
| L 1
|- align="center" bgcolor="#ccffcc"
| 8
| October 27
| @ Chicago
| W 115–110 (OT)
| Paul Westphal (38)
| Chicago Stadium7,807
| 6–2
| W 1
|- align="center" bgcolor="#ffcccc"
| 9
| October 28
| @ Kansas City
| L 102–112
| Alvan Adams,Walter Davis (23)
| Kemper Arena9,534
| 6–3
| L 1
|- align="center" bgcolor="#ccffcc"
| 10
| October 31
| New York
| W 120–108
| Paul Westphal (35)
| Arizona Veterans Memorial Coliseum11,197
| 7–3
| W 1
|-
!!Streak
|-
|- align="center" bgcolor="#ccffcc"
| 11
| November 2
| @ New Orleans
| W 106–99
| Paul Westphal (27)
| Louisiana Superdome6,943
| 8–3
| W 2
|- align="center" bgcolor="#ffcccc"
| 12
| November 4
| @ Houston
| L 103–110
| Walter Davis (25)
| The Summit9,163
| 8–4
| L 1
|- align="center" bgcolor="#ccffcc"
| 13
| November 8
| Cleveland
| W 118–96
| Ron Lee (24)
| Arizona Veterans Memorial Coliseum9,311
| 9–4
| W 1
|- align="center" bgcolor="#ffcccc"
| 14
| November 10
| Denver
| L 132–150
| Paul Westphal (27)
| Arizona Veterans Memorial Coliseum10,277
| 9–5
| L 1
|- align="center" bgcolor="#ccffcc"
| 15
| November 12
| New Orleans
| W 128–122
| Alvan Adams (33)
| Arizona Veterans Memorial Coliseum9,158
| 10–5
| W 1
|- align="center" bgcolor="#ccffcc"
| 16
| November 15
| @ San Antonio
| W 125–119
| Paul Westphal (39)
| HemisFair Arena10,489
| 11–5
| W 2
|- align="center" bgcolor="#ffcccc"
| 17
| November 17
| @ Philadelphia
| L 94–95
| Paul Westphal (25)
| The Spectrum11,513
| 11–6
| L 1
|- align="center" bgcolor="#ccffcc"
| 18
| November 18
| @ Detroit
| W 119–105
| Paul Westphal (28)
| Pontiac Silverdome10,789
| 12–6
| W 1
|- align="center" bgcolor="#ccffcc"
| 19
| November 21
| @ Cleveland
| W 110–108
| Walter Davis (28)
| Coliseum at Richfield6,524
| 13–6
| W 2
|- align="center" bgcolor="#ccffcc"
| 20
| November 22
| @ Indiana
| W 115–110
| Walter Davis (32)
| Market Square Arena9,432
| 14–6
| W 3
|- align="center" bgcolor="#ccffcc"
| 21
| November 24
| Houston
| W 120–113
| Walter Davis (37)
| Arizona Veterans Memorial Coliseum12,660
| 15–6
| W 4
|- align="center" bgcolor="#ccffcc"
| 22
| November 26
| Chicago
| W 125–109
| Alvan Adams (22)
| Arizona Veterans Memorial Coliseum10,921
| 16–6
| W 5
|- align="center" bgcolor="#ffcccc"
| 23
| November 28
| @ Chicago
| L 112–124
| Walter Davis (26)
| Chicago Stadium7,826
| 16–7
| L 1
|- align="center" bgcolor="#ccffcc"
| 24
| November 30
| Detroit
| W 119–109
| Paul Westphal (29)
| Arizona Veterans Memorial Coliseum9,633
| 17–7
| W 1
|-
!!Streak
|-
|- align="center" bgcolor="#ffcccc"
| 25
| December 1
| @ Los Angeles
| L 122–130
| Paul Westphal (32)
| The Forum10,529
| 17–8
| L 1
|- align="center" bgcolor="#ffcccc"
| 26
| December 2
| Golden State
| L 108–116
| Alvan Adams (29)
| Arizona Veterans Memorial Coliseum9,167
| 17–9
| L 2
|- align="center" bgcolor="#ccffcc"
| 27
| December 6
| Atlanta
| W 136–109
| Walter Davis (25)
| Arizona Veterans Memorial Coliseum10,345
| 18–9
| W 1
|- align="center" bgcolor="#ccffcc"
| 28
| December 8
| @ Boston
| W 124–104
| Paul Westphal (30)
| Boston Garden11,762
| 19–9
| W 2
|- align="center" bgcolor="#ffcccc"
| 29
| December 9
| @ Washington
| L 98–101
| Paul Westphal (30)
| Capital Centre17,438
| 19–10
| L 1
|- align="center" bgcolor="#ffcccc"
| 30
| December 12
| @ Milwaukee
| L 114–120
| Paul Westphal (36)
| MECCA Arena10,938
| 19–11
| L 2
|- align="center" bgcolor="#ccffcc"
| 31
| December 16
| Los Angeles
| W 119–100
| Alvan Adams,Paul Westphal (25)
| Arizona Veterans Memorial Coliseum11,327
| 20–11
| W 1
|- align="center" bgcolor="#ffcccc"
| 32
| December 17
| @ San Diego
| L 110–116
| Alvan Adams (32)
| San Diego Sports Arena6,068
| 20–12
| L 1
|- align="center" bgcolor="#ffcccc"
| 33
| December 20
| Washington
| L 129–137
| Paul Westphal (36)
| Arizona Veterans Memorial Coliseum9,789
| 20–13
| L 2
|- align="center" bgcolor="#ccffcc"
| 34
| December 22
| Kansas City
| W 123–103
| Alvan Adams (32)
| Arizona Veterans Memorial Coliseum10,533
| 21–13
| W 1
|- align="center" bgcolor="#ccffcc"
| 35
| December 26
| @ Denver
| W 106–102
| Walter Davis (31)
| McNichols Sports Arena16,325
| 22–13
| W 2
|- align="center" bgcolor="#ccffcc"
| 36
| December 28
| Portland
| W 129–127 (OT)
| Walter Davis (42)
| Arizona Veterans Memorial Coliseum12,510
| 23–13
| W 3
|- align="center" bgcolor="#ffcccc"
| 37
| December 29
| @ Seattle
| L 92–119
| Mike Bratz (15)
| Kingdome20,565
| 23–14
| L 1
|- align="center" bgcolor="#ccffcc"
| 38
| December 30
| Boston
| W 112–109
| Alvan Adams (28)
| Arizona Veterans Memorial Coliseum12,660
| 24–14
| W 1
|-
!!Streak
|-
|- align="center" bgcolor="#ccffcc"
| 39
| January 2
| @ New York
| W 114–102
| Alvan Adams (28)
| Madison Square Garden11,266
| 25–14
| W 2
|- align="center" bgcolor="#ffcccc"
| 40
| January 5
| @ Washington
| L 94–104
| Ron Lee (19)
| Capital Centre14,929
| 25–15
| L 1
|- align="center" bgcolor="#ccffcc"
| 41
| January 6
| @ Philadelphia
| W 143–139 (OT)
| Walter Davis (35)
| The Spectrum16,109
| 26–15
| W 1
|- align="center" bgcolor="#ffcccc"
| 42
| January 7
| @ New Jersey
| L 112–117
| Alvan Adams (32)
| Rutgers Athletic Center3,439
| 26–16
| L 1
|- align="center" bgcolor="#ffcccc"
| 43
| January 11
| Seattle
| L 106–109
| Walter Davis (26)
| Arizona Veterans Memorial Coliseum12,660
| 26–17
| L 2
|- align="center" bgcolor="#ffcccc"
| 44
| January 13
| Indiana
| L 99–102
| Walter Davis (24)
| Arizona Veterans Memorial Coliseum12,660
| 26–18
| L 3
|- align="center" bgcolor="#ffcccc"
| 45
| January 17
| @ Milwaukee
| L 118–123
| Truck Robinson (25)
| MECCA Arena10,661
| 26–19
| L 4
|- align="center" bgcolor="#ccffcc"
| 46
| January 18
| @ Detroit
| W 97–87
| Walter Davis (26)
| Pontiac Silverdome5,839
| 27–19
| W 1
|- align="center" bgcolor="#ccffcc"
| 47
| January 20
| Houston
| W 116–97
| Paul Westphal (28)
| Arizona Veterans Memorial Coliseum12,660
| 28–19
| W 2
|- align="center" bgcolor="#ccffcc"
| 48
| January 24
| Philadelphia
| W 101–94
| Truck Robinson (26)
| Arizona Veterans Memorial Coliseum12,660
| 29–19
| W 3
|- align="center" bgcolor="#ccffcc"
| 49
| January 26
| New York
| W 108–107
| Walter Davis (24)
| Arizona Veterans Memorial Coliseum11,813
| 30–19
| W 4
|- align="center" bgcolor="#ffcccc"
| 50
| January 28
| New Jersey
| L 114–117
| Alvan Adams,Walter Davis (25)
| Arizona Veterans Memorial Coliseum12,357
| 30–20
| L 1
|- align="center" bgcolor="#ccffcc"
| 51
| January 31
| Milwaukee
| W 123–118
| Paul Westphal (28)
| Arizona Veterans Memorial Coliseum11,736
| 31–20
| W 1
|-
!!Streak
|-
|- align="center" bgcolor="#ccffcc"
| 52
| February 2
| San Antonio
| W 133–108
| Alvan Adams (24)
| Arizona Veterans Memorial Coliseum12,660
| 32–20
| W 2
|- align="center" bgcolor="#ffcccc"
| 53
| February 6
| @ Portland
| L 93–110
| Truck Robinson (19)
| Memorial Coliseum12,666
| 32–21
| L 1
|- align="center" bgcolor="#ffcccc"
| 54
| February 9
| Atlanta
| L 102–105
| Paul Westphal (32)
| Arizona Veterans Memorial Coliseum11,928
| 32–22
| L 2
|- align="center" bgcolor="#ccffcc"
| 55
| February 11
| Cleveland
| W 136–101
| Truck Robinson (24)
| Arizona Veterans Memorial Coliseum10,972
| 33–22
| W 1
|- align="center" bgcolor="#ccffcc"
| 56
| February 15
| Washington
| W 119–108
| Paul Westphal (32)
| Arizona Veterans Memorial Coliseum12,660
| 34–22
| W 2
|- align="center" bgcolor="#ffcccc"
| 57
| February 16
| @ Seattle
| L 104–119
| Mike Bratz (19)
| Kingdome23,103
| 34–23
| L 1
|- align="center" bgcolor="#ccffcc"
| 58
| February 17
| New Orleans
| W 136–112
| Alvan Adams (22)
| Arizona Veterans Memorial Coliseum12,660
| 35–23
| W 1
|- align="center" bgcolor="#ccffcc"
| 59
| February 20
| @ New York
| W 117–107
| Paul Westphal (36)
| Madison Square Garden10,921
| 36–23
| W 2
|- align="center" bgcolor="#ffcccc"
| 60
| February 21
| @ New Jersey
| L 112–123
| Paul Westphal (25)
| Rutgers Athletic Center3,812
| 36–24
| L 1
|- align="center" bgcolor="#ffcccc"
| 61
| February 23
| @ Kansas City
| L 112–121
| Truck Robinson (28)
| Kemper Arena10,768
| 36–25
| L 2
|- align="center" bgcolor="#ffcccc"
| 62
| February 24
| @ Atlanta
| L 85–110
| Truck Robinson (21)
| Omni Coliseum12,281
| 36–26
| L 3
|- align="center" bgcolor="#ccffcc"
| 63
| February 28
| Indiana
| W 103–102
| Paul Westphal (27)
| Arizona Veterans Memorial Coliseum10,735
| 37–26
| W 1
|-
!!Streak
|-
|- align="center" bgcolor="#ffcccc"
| 64
| March 2
| Denver
| L 105–119
| Paul Westphal (28)
| Arizona Veterans Memorial Coliseum11,835
| 37–27
| L 1
|- align="center" bgcolor="#ccffcc"
| 65
| March 4
| Philadelphia
| W 119–94
| Walter Davis (26)
| Arizona Veterans Memorial Coliseum10,722
| 38–27
| W 1
|- align="center" bgcolor="#ccffcc"
| 66
| March 8
| Chicago
| W 132–117
| Alvan Adams,Don Buse,Walter Davis (21)
| Arizona Veterans Memorial Coliseum10,126
| 39–27
| W 2
|- align="center" bgcolor="#ffcccc"
| 67
| March 11
| @ Indiana
| L 111–112
| Paul Westphal (24)
| Market Square Arena14,173
| 39–28
| L 1
|- align="center" bgcolor="#ccffcc"
| 68
| March 13
| @ Cleveland
| W 124–120
| Walter Davis (36)
| Coliseum at Richfield7,690
| 40–28
| W 1
|- align="center" bgcolor="#ccffcc"
| 69
| March 14
| @ Boston
| W 126–117
| Paul Westphal (39)
| Boston Garden10,308
| 41–28
| W 2
|- align="center" bgcolor="#ccffcc"
| 70
| March 16
| @ San Antonio
| W 128–122
| Paul Westphal (43)
| HemisFair Arena14,864
| 42–28
| W 3
|- align="center" bgcolor="#ffcccc"
| 71
| March 17
| @ Houston
| L 122–134
| Paul Westphal (22)
| The Summit12,557
| 42–29
| L 1
|- align="center" bgcolor="#ffcccc"
| 72
| March 18
| @ New Orleans
| L 117–121
| Walter Davis,Paul Westphal (29)
| Louisiana Superdome5,108
| 42–30
| L 2
|- align="center" bgcolor="#ccffcc"
| 73
| March 21
| Boston
| W 134–113
| Walter Davis (33)
| Arizona Veterans Memorial Coliseum11,568
| 43–30
| W 1
|- align="center" bgcolor="#ccffcc"
| 74
| March 23
| Kansas City
| W 126–107
| Paul Westphal (36)
| Arizona Veterans Memorial Coliseum12,660
| 44–30
| W 2
|- align="center" bgcolor="#ccffcc"
| 75
| March 25
| @ Golden State
| W 111–95
| Paul Westphal (25)
| Oakland–Alameda County Coliseum Arena10,651
| 45–30
| W 3
|- align="center" bgcolor="#ccffcc"
| 76
| March 28
| Los Angeles
| W 112–106
| Paul Westphal (32)
| Arizona Veterans Memorial Coliseum11,805
| 46–30
| W 4
|- align="center" bgcolor="#ccffcc"
| 77
| March 30
| Seattle
| W 113–111 (OT)
| Walter Davis (40)
| Arizona Veterans Memorial Coliseum12,660
| 47–30
| W 5
|-
!!Streak
|-
|- align="center" bgcolor="#ccffcc"
| 78
| April 1
| Detroit
| W 116–105
| Alvan Adams (23)
| Arizona Veterans Memorial Coliseum10,550
| 48–30
| W 6
|- align="center" bgcolor="#ccffcc"
| 79
| April 4
| Portland
| W 106–95
| Paul Westphal (21)
| Arizona Veterans Memorial Coliseum11,305
| 49–30
| W 7
|- align="center" bgcolor="#ccffcc"
| 80
| April 6
| San Diego
| W 118–117
| Alvan Adams (23)
| Arizona Veterans Memorial Coliseum12,660
| 50–30
| W 8
|- align="center" bgcolor="#ffcccc"
| 81
| April 7
| @ San Diego
| L 116–120
| Walter Davis,Paul Westphal (22)
| San Diego Sports Arena11,614
| 50–31
| L 1
|- align="center" bgcolor="#ffcccc"
| 82
| April 8
| @ Los Angeles
| L 103–111
| Walter Davis (21)
| The Forum11,973
| 50–32
| L 2
|-

Playoffs

Game log

|- align="center" bgcolor="#ccffcc"
| 1
| April 10
| Portland
| W 107–103
| Paul Westphal (28)
| Adams, Davis (5)
| Alvan Adams (9)
| Arizona Veterans Memorial Coliseum12,660
| 1–0
|- align="center" bgcolor="#ffcccc"
| 2
| April 13
| @ Portland
| L 92–96
| Walter Davis (31)
| Gar Heard (9)
| Paul Westphal (6)
| Memorial Coliseum12,666
| 1–1
|- align="center" bgcolor="#ccffcc"
| 3
| April 15
| Portland
| W 101–91
| Paul Westphal (26)
| Gar Heard (12)
| Walter Davis (8)
| Arizona Veterans Memorial Coliseum12,660
| 2–1
|-

|- align="center" bgcolor="#ccffcc"
| 1
| April 17
| Kansas City
| W 102–99
| Paul Westphal (25)
| Truck Robinson (12)
| Don Buse (5)
| Arizona Veterans Memorial Coliseum12,660
| 1–0
|- align="center" bgcolor="#ffcccc"
| 2
| April 20
| @ Kansas City
| L 91–111
| Truck Robinson (17)
| Truck Robinson (13)
| Walter Davis (5)
| Kemper Arena13,659
| 1–1
|- align="center" bgcolor="#ccffcc"
| 3
| April 22
| Kansas City
| W 108–93
| Walter Davis (22)
| Alvan Adams (9)
| Walter Davis (7)
| Arizona State University Activity Center14,301
| 2–1
|- align="center" bgcolor="#ccffcc"
| 4
| April 25
| @ Kansas City
| W 108–94
| Paul Westphal (26)
| Gar Heard (14)
| Alvan Adams (8)
| Kemper Arena13,184
| 3–1
|- align="center" bgcolor="#ccffcc"
| 5
| April 27
| Kansas City
| W 120–99
| Paul Westphal (32)
| Joel Kramer (11)
| Bratz, Kramer (5)
| Arizona Veterans Memorial Coliseum12,660
| 4–1
|-

|- align="center" bgcolor="#ffcccc"
| 1
| May 1
| @ Seattle
| L 93–108
| Alvan Adams (18)
| Alvan Adams (12)
| Adams, Davis (4)
| Seattle Center Coliseum14,098
| 0–1
|- align="center" bgcolor="#ffcccc"
| 2
| May 4
| @ Seattle
| L 97–103
| Paul Westphal (29)
| Truck Robinson (9)
| Buse, Davis (5)
| Kingdome31,964
| 0–2
|- align="center" bgcolor="#ccffcc"
| 3
| May 6
| Seattle
| W 113–103
| Paul Westphal (25)
| Walter Davis (10)
| Paul Westphal (6)
| Arizona Veterans Memorial Coliseum12,660
| 1–2
|- align="center" bgcolor="#ccffcc"
| 4
| May 8
| Seattle
| W 100–91
| Walter Davis (27)
| Gar Heard (12)
| Paul Westphal (10)
| Arizona Veterans Memorial Coliseum12,660
| 2–2
|- align="center" bgcolor="#ccffcc"
| 5
| May 11
| @ Seattle
| W 99–93
| Paul Westphal (27)
| Truck Robinson (14)
| Paul Westphal (5)
| Kingdome28,935
| 3–2
|- align="center" bgcolor="#ffcccc"
| 6
| May 13
| Seattle
| L 105–106
| Paul Westphal (29)
| Joel Kramer (8)
| Paul Westphal (8)
| Arizona Veterans Memorial Coliseum12,660
| 3–3
|- align="center" bgcolor="#ffcccc"
| 7
| May 17
| @ Seattle
| L 110–114
| Walter Davis (26)
| Truck Robinson (14)
| Paul Westphal (9)
| Kingdome37,552
| 4–3
|-

Awards and honors

All-Star
 Paul Westphal was voted as a starter for the Western Conference in the All-Star Game. It was his third consecutive All-Star selection. Westphal finished second in voting among Western Conference guards with 251,829 votes.
 Walter Davis was selected as a reserve for the Western Conference in the All-Star Game. It was his second consecutive All-Star selection. Davis finished fifth in voting among Western Conference forwards with 118,546 votes.

Season
 Paul Westphal was named to the All-NBA First Team.
 Walter Davis was named to the All-NBA Second Team. Davis also finished tenth in MVP voting.
 Don Buse was named to the NBA All-Defensive First Team.

Player statistics

Season

* – Stats with the Suns.
^ – Minimum 125 free throws made.

Playoffs

† – Minimum 20 field goals made.

Transactions

Trades

Free agents

Additions

Subtractions

References
 Standings on Basketball Reference

Phoenix Suns seasons
Phoenix